Rene William Howell (19 December 1916 – 1989) was a British middle-distance runner. He competed in the men's 3000 metres steeplechase at the 1948 Summer Olympics.

References

1916 births
1989 deaths
Athletes (track and field) at the 1948 Summer Olympics
British male middle-distance runners
British male steeplechase runners
Olympic athletes of Great Britain
Place of birth missing